Černýšovice is a municipality and village in Tábor District in the South Bohemian Region of the Czech Republic. It has about 90 inhabitants.

Administrative parts
The village of Hutě is an administrative part of Černýšovice.

Gallery

References

Villages in Tábor District